Gulfcrest is a census-designated place and unincorporated community in Mobile County, Alabama, United States. Its population was 142 as of the 2020 census.

Geography
Gulfcrest is in northern Mobile County, along U.S. Route 45, which leads southeast  to Mobile and north  to Citronelle.

Chickasaw Creek, a south-flowing tributary of the Mobile River, forms the eastern boundary of the Gulfcrest CDP.

Demographics

The community is about a third African American.

Notable people
Oscar W. Adams Sr., publisher of the Birmingham Reporter and father of Alabama Supreme Court justice Oscar W. Adams Jr.

Education
Residents are zoned to Mobile County Public School System campuses. Residents are zoned to McDavid-Jones Elementary School (K-5), Lott Middle School (6-8), and Citronelle High School (9-12).

References

Census-designated places in Mobile County, Alabama
Census-designated places in Alabama